The Qarabağ 2015–16 season is Qarabağ's 23rd Azerbaijan Premier League season, of which they are defending champions, and will be their eighth season under manager Gurban Gurbanov. They will participate in the League, the Azerbaijan Cup and the UEFA Champions League, entering at the Second qualifying round.

Squad

Out on loan

Transfers

Summer

In:

Out:

 Quintana's transfer was announced on 2 March 2015, but wasn't eligible to play until the summer transfer window.

Winter

In:

Out:

Friendlies

Competitions

Azerbaijan Premier League

Results summary

Results

League table

Azerbaijan Cup

Final

UEFA Champions League

Qualifying phase

UEFA Europa League

Qualifying phase

Group stage

Squad statistics

Appearances and goals

|-
|colspan="14"|Players away from Qarabağ on loan:
.

|-
|colspan="14"|Players who appeared for Qarabağ but left during the season:

Goal scorers

Disciplinary record

Notes
Qarabağ have played their home games at the Tofiq Bahramov Stadium since 1993 due to the ongoing situation in Quzanlı.
Rudar Pljevlja played their home match at Stadion pod Malim Brdom, Petrovac, instead of their regular stadium Gradski stadion, Pljevlja.

References

External links 
 Official Website

Qarabağ FK seasons
Azerbaijani football clubs 2015–16 season
Qarabağ
Qarabağ